Hannifin is a surname. Notable people with the surname include:

Daniel L. Hannifin (1863–?), American politician
Jack Hannifin (1883–1945), American baseball player
Patrick J. Hannifin (1923–2014), United States Navy vice admiral